Megapurpuricenus is a genus of long-horned beetles in the family Cerambycidae containing one described species, M. magnificus.

References

Further reading

 
 

Trachyderini
Monotypic Cerambycidae genera